The 1990 NAIA World Series was the 34th annual tournament hosted by the National Association of Intercollegiate Athletics to determine the national champion of baseball among its member colleges and universities in the United States and Canada.

The tournament was played at Harris Field in Lewiston, Idaho.

Hometown team and three-time defending champions Lewis–Clark State (43–13) defeated Auburn Montgomery (40–25) in a single-game championship series, 9–4, to win the Warriors' sixth NAIA World Series. This would go on to be the fourth of six consecutive World Series championships for the program.

Lewis–Clark State outfielder Mark Rasmussen was named tournament MVP.

Bracket

Preliminary bracket

Championship bracket

See also
 1990 NCAA Division I baseball tournament
 1990 NCAA Division II baseball tournament
 1990 NCAA Division III baseball tournament
 1990 NAIA Softball World Series

Reference

|NAIA World Series
NAIA World Series
NAIA World Series
NAIA World Series